Camborne is a town in Cornwall.

Camborne may also refer to:

 Camborne Hill
 Camborne School of Mines
 Camborne, British Columbia
 Camborne, New Zealand
 Camborne, Ontario
 Camborne (UK Parliament constituency)

See also
 Cambourne, settlement in Cambridgeshire